Chinese Taipei participated in the 2010 Asian Para Games–First Asian Para Games in Guangzhou, China from 13 to 19 December 2010. Athletes from Taiwan won total 26 medals (including eight gold), and finished at the eighth spot in a medal table.

References

Nations at the 2010 Asian Para Games
2010 in Taiwanese sport
Chinese Taipei at the Asian Para Games